Silvana Flores Dorrell (born 18 April 2002) is a professional footballer who plays as a midfielder for Liga MX Femenil  club Monterrey. Born in Canada, she represents the Mexico women's national team.

Early life
Flores was born in Georgetown, Ontario, Canada to a Mexican father, Rubén Flores, and a Canadian mother of English descent. She began playing soccer at age 4 with Georgetown SC.

Club career
After spending time in the academies of Arsenal and Chelsea, Flores joined Reading in February 2021. In the summer ahead of the 2021–22 FA WSL season, Flores transferred to Tottenham Hotspur.

She signed with Liga MX Femenil club Monterrey on June 16, 2022.

International career
When she was 11, Flores trained as a guest player with the Cayman Islands women's national under-15 football team, which was then coached by her father. She later attended some camps of the youth programs of Canada and England. By 2018, she had already chosen to play for Mexico internationally.

Flores represented Mexico at the 2018 FIFA U-17 Women's World Cup (Runner-Up), the 2019 Sud Ladies Cup and two CONCACAF Women's U-20 Championship editions (2020 and 2022). She made her senior debut on 23 February 2021 in a 0–0 friendly home draw against Costa Rica.

Personal life
Flores' siblings Marcelo and Tatiana are also part of the Mexican men's and women's youth programs, respectively.

References

2002 births
Living people
Citizens of Mexico through descent
Mexican women's footballers
Women's association football midfielders
Mexico women's international footballers
Mexican people of Canadian descent
Sportspeople of Canadian descent
Mexican people of English descent
Mexican expatriate women's footballers
Mexican expatriate sportspeople in the Cayman Islands
Expatriate footballers in the Cayman Islands
People from Halton Hills
Soccer people from Ontario
Canadian women's soccer players
Canadian people of Mexican descent
Canadian sportspeople of North American descent
Sportspeople of Mexican descent
Canadian people of English descent
Canadian expatriate women's soccer players
Citizens of the United Kingdom through descent
English women's footballers
Arsenal W.F.C. players
Chelsea F.C. Women players
Reading F.C. Women players
English people of Mexican descent
English people of Canadian descent
English expatriate women's footballers
English expatriates in the Cayman Islands
Tottenham Hotspur F.C. Women players
Mexican expatriate sportspeople in England
Canadian expatriate sportspeople in England